Margaret Lawder (1900-1983) was an Irish and South African botanist known for her conservation work. In 1922, at the age of 22, she emigrated to the Cape of Good Hope with her husband Commander Edward Francis Lawder R.N. and they became official plant collectors for the Kirstenbosch National Botanical Garden in Cape Town. Edward took pictures of the flowers and Margaret wrote the descriptions of them.

They contributed articles to the Journal of the Botanical Society both before and after it became Veld & Flora. They also contributed articles about Cape plants to other South African and international journals.

Lawder lived on Leliefontein farm in the Klein Drakenstein area. She introduced the cultivation of Watsonia marginata, a plant endemic to Leliefontein farm.

She was one of the founding members of the Paarl Beautifying Society in 1931 when the area was overrun with alien vegetation. They established an indigenous garden in a section of the Paarl Mountain Nature Reserve, known as Meulwater Wild Flower Reserve. She was also a founding member and the first president of the Country Garden Club in the Paarl district.

She was actively involved in botany until her death in 1983.

References

External links
 

20th-century South African botanists
South African women botanists
1900 births
1983 deaths
20th-century South African women scientists
Irish emigrants to South Africa (before 1923)